Marko Attila Hoare (born 1972) is a British historian of the former Yugoslavia who also writes about current affairs, especially Southeast Europe, including Turkey and the Caucasus. Marko is Associate Professor of History at the University Sarajevo School of Science and Technology, in Sarajevo.

Biography
Hoare is the son of the British translator Quintin Hoare and the Croatian journalist and historian Branka Magaš.

Hoare has been studying the history of the former Yugoslavia since 1993. In the summer of 1995, he acted as translator for the humanitarian aid convoy to the Bosnian town of Tuzla, organised by Workers' Aid for Bosnia, a movement of solidarity in support of the Bosnian people. His degrees in History are a BA (1994; later converted to an MA) from the University of Cambridge and a MPhil (1997) and PhD from Yale University (2000).

Between 1997-1998 Marko lived and worked in Sarajevo, Bosnia and Hercegovina, and from 1998 to 2001, he lived and worked in Belgrade, Serbia. He was resident in Serbia during the Kosovo War of 1999. He later worked at the International Criminal Tribunal for the former Yugoslavia, where he participated in the drafting of the indictment against Slobodan Milošević. Hoare was a research assistant at the Bosnian Institute in London (founded by his father Quintin), a British Academy Postdoctoral Research Fellow, a research fellow of the History Faculty of the University of Cambridge, and a Reader at Kingston University in London. He has been an associate professor at the Sarajevo School of Science and Technology since 2017.

He was European Neighbourhood Section Director for the Henry Jackson Society (HJS). In 2012, he resigned from the HJS, saying it had become "an abrasively right-wing forum with an anti-Muslim tinge", and over significant differences with associate director Douglas Murray.

Hoare was also an advisory editor of Democratiya, and he is a member of the editorial board of Spirit of Bosnia, an international, interdisciplinary, bilingual, online journal. His blog, "Greater Surbiton", publishes his commentary and analysis, particularly on South East Europe. He is a signatory of the Euston Manifesto, and was formerly connected with the British website Harry's Place. He has written for Left Foot Forward website, Prospect and Standpoint magazines, and The Guardian newspaper.

Hoare was a childhood friend of Ed Miliband, leader of the Labour Party UK. In 2010, he appeared in Channel 4's TV docu-drama Miliband of Brothers, where he commented on his memories of Miliband and his brother David Miliband. In criticising the position of the Conservative London Mayor Boris Johnson, Hoare has argued in favour of arming the opponents of Bashar al-Assad in Syria.

ICTY engagements
Marko went to serve as a research officer and war crimes investigator at the International Criminal Tribunal for the former Yugoslavia. He was also expert witness for the court there. He participated in drafting of the indictment against Slobodan Milošević.

Books
The particular focus of Hoare's writing has been on the history of Bosnia and Herzegovina: 
How Bosnia Armed: The Birth and Rise of the Bosnian Army (London: Saqi, 2004) – examines the history of the Bosnian Army and Bosnian internal politics in the 1990s. 
Genocide and Resistance in Hitler's Bosnia: The Partisans and the Chetniks, 1941–1943 (London: Oxford University Press, 2006) – looks at the conflict between the Yugoslav Partisans and Chetniks in Bosnia during World War II. 
The History of Bosnia: From the Middle Ages to the Present Day (London: Saqi, 2007) - book focuses in particular on the history of national identity in Bosnia. 
The Bosnian Muslims in the Second World War: A History (London: C. Hurst & Co., 2013) – looks at the role of the Bosnian Muslims in World War II.

Awards
Hoare is the recipient of the 2010 Congress of North American Bosniaks (CNAB) award for outstanding contributions to the advancement of history. The award is recognition for his lifelong dedication to presenting the historical truth and standing up against genocide denial.

References

Further reading
 
 Edina Becirevic and Marko Attila Hoare, Bosnian Muslims in World War II, Bosnian Institute, 11 February 2014

External links 
 Hoare's CV at the SSST faculty webpage (direct-download link)
 Hoare's Kingston University faculty webpage
 Greater Surbiton (Hoare's blog)
 The Normblog Profile 258: Marko Attila Hoare
 Henry Jackson Society Archive: Marko Attila Hoare
 

1972 births
Living people
Academics of Kingston University
Academics of the University of Cambridge
Alumni of Robinson College, Cambridge
British bloggers
British historians
British male journalists
British officials of the United Nations
British people of Croatian descent
Historians of Bosnia and Herzegovina
Historians of the Balkans
International Criminal Tribunal for the former Yugoslavia officials
Male bloggers
Yale University alumni
Academic staff of the Sarajevo School of Science and Technology